The X Factor is a British television music competition to find new singing talent. The fourth series was broadcast on ITV from 18 August 2007 and was won by Leon Jackson on 15 December 2007, with Rhydian Roberts finishing as the runner-up and Dannii Minogue emerging as the winning mentor. Dermot O'Leary presented for the first time, replacing Kate Thornton, who had been presenting the show since series 1 in 2004. Fearne Cotton replaced Ben Shephard as presenter on the spin-off show The Xtra Factor. The original judging panel consisted of Simon Cowell, Minogue, Sharon Osbourne and Brian Friedman. Friedman left the panel halfway through the first audition episode and was replaced by former judge Louis Walsh.

This series saw a number of changes to the format, most notably the lowering of the minimum age for participants from 16 to 14 and the increase in the number of categories from three to four, resulting from the division of the 16-24s category into separate male and female categories.

Jackson's prize as winner was a £1 million recording contract. His first single release was "When You Believe", arranged for the finalists by composer Stephen Schwartz and released to download on 16 December 2007, with the physical format following on 19 December. The single became that year's Christmas number one on the UK Singles Chart and was also the fourth best selling single of 2007. This series was the first to be sponsored by The Carphone Warehouse after being sponsored by Nokia since the first series.

Judges and presenters

On 8 March 2007, it was announced that judge Louis Walsh, who had appeared in all three previous series would be stepping back from his judging role but would continue to manage the acts after the show. This, along with the additional category, created vacancies for two new judges to join the original panel of Sharon Osbourne and Simon Cowell. Walsh was replaced by American choreographer Brian Friedman, who was hired after impressing Cowell on his show Grease Is the Word. A fourth judge was also brought in: Australian singer, actress and Australia's Got Talent judge Dannii Minogue. Cowell hired Minogue after viewing tapes of her judging on Australia's Got Talent, and because of her 30 years experience as a singer and performer.

On 22 June, it was announced that Friedman had stepped down as a judge and would be replaced by Walsh. Friedman remained on the show as a performance coach and choreographer, billed on screen as "Creative Director". Suggestions that Walsh's firing and rehiring was concocted to generate publicity were denied. Commenting on Friedman's replacement by Walsh, Osbourne said that there was no "chemistry" within the original judging line-up, and that the atmosphere was "very uncomfortable". Cowell stated that the atmosphere was "very weird". For his part, Friedman said he felt "incredibly let down with the British talent".

Following the departure of series 1–3 presenter Kate Thornton, Dermot O'Leary took over as presenter for series 4. In an interview with ITV Head of Entertainment and Comedy, Paul Jackson, O'Leary said he was still getting used to handling the rejected at the auditions: "I'm still trying to work it out. It's an emotionally exhausting show to do." On 2 May 2007, it was announced that Ben Shephard had quit his role as presenter of spin-off show The Xtra Factor on ITV2. An X Factor insider said: "Ben had a big chance of being the main presenter on X Factor until he did Soapstar Superstar last year on ITV1. He didn't impress some of the X Factor bosses on that live show and moved down the pecking order." Cowell said: "I wish Ben good luck. He has done a great job on The Xtra Factor." Shephard later signed up to front DanceX, a BBC One series hunting for a modern-day version of '70s dance outfit Hot Gossip. He was replaced by Top of the Pops presenter and BBC Radio 1 DJ Fearne Cotton. Osbourne left after this series and Cheryl Cole replaced her in series 5.

Selection process

Auditions
Initial auditions with producers took place in April and May 2007, with callbacks in front of the judges in June. The number of applicants reached an all-time high with 150,000 people auditioning in the cities of London (Wembley Stadium, 4–7 June), Manchester (25–28 June), Belfast (6 July), Cardiff (Angel Hotel, Cardiff, 10–11 July), Sheffield (Sheffield City Hall, 15 July), Birmingham (The ICC, 18–20 July) and Glasgow (Crowne Plaza Glasgow). Eight thousand people attended an open audition at Emirates Stadium (home of Arsenal F.C.), London, on 9 June 2007. Due to the record number of applications an additional open audition was held at Birmingham Alexander Stadium in Birmingham on 21 July 2007.

Auditionees needed a minimum of three "yes" votes (previously two) from the judges to proceed to the next round. Walsh missed the London auditions due to being sacked at the time, but returned to the judging panel from the Manchester auditions onwards after Friedman stepped down. Osbourne was absent from some of the auditions in Birmingham due to filming commitments with America's Got Talent, so the auditions went ahead with just Cowell, Walsh and Minogue as judges.

The first episode aired on 18 August, and featured auditions from London, Manchester and Birmingham. 25 August episode featured auditions from Birmingham, Manchester and Cardiff. The third episode premiered on 1 September, and featured auditions from Glasgow, Birmingham and Cardiff. The Belfast auditions, along with those from Birmingham and Manchester, were featured on 8 September. The fifth episode aired on 15 September, and featured auditions from Sheffield, Birmingham and Manchester. The final audition episode aired on 22 September, and featured auditions from Manchester, Birmingham and Cardiff.

Bootcamp
This series saw all four judges work together at the bootcamp, rather than disband to manage their own categories as happened in previous series. Bootcamp was broadcast over a two-part show on Saturday 29 September. Episode 7 showed the first round at the Heythrop Park Hotel in Oxfordshire, where the acts were whittled down to 12 in each category (48 acts in total). The next episode, showing the second round at the Apollo Theatre in London, was screened a few hours later. Here the acts were further reduced to six in each category – a total of 24 acts. After this, the judges were told which category they were to mentor. Cowell was given the Groups, Minogue was given the Boys, Osbourne was given the Girls and Walsh was given the Over 25s.

Bootcamp Themes for the first task

 Boys: Perform a song that they would release as their first single
 Girls: Perform a song that either reflects the happiest or saddest time in their lives.
 Over 25s: Perform a song that relates to an younger audience
 Groups: Perform a song by famous pop groups

Second Task Songs per Category

Boys: 
 "Let It Be"
 "Home"
 "If You're Not the One"
 "Hero"
 "I Can't Make You Love Me"
 "When I Fall in Love"

Girls: 
 "Wishing on a Star"
 "Sorry Seems to Be the Hardest Word"
 "Beautiful"
 "Don't Speak" 
 "Torn"
 "I'm Not a Girl, Not Yet a Woman"
 "I Don't Want to Talk About It"
 "One Moment in Time"

Groups:
 "I Want You Back"
 "I’ll Stand by You" 
 "Ain't No Mountain High Enough"
 "You've Got a Friend"
  "Could It Be Magic"

Over 25s
 "Chasing Cars"
 "You're Beautiful"
 "Let There Be Love" 
 "Your Song"
 "Father and Son"

Judges' houses
In the "judges' houses" round, each judge chose three of their remaining six acts to go forward and represent them on the live shows. The locations for the round were confirmed during episode 8 on 29 September; they were later revealed by Louis Walsh not to be the judges' real homes. Cowell took his six acts to Marbella; Osbourne to Los Angeles; Walsh to Dublin; and Minogue to Ibiza. As in previous series, the judges were joined by an assistant to help them make their decisions: Cowell was joined by former pop star Sinitta; Osbourne by The Pussycat Dolls lead singer Nicole Scherzinger; Walsh by Westlife singer Kian Egan; and Minogue by songwriter and producer Terry Ronald.

The judges' houses stage was broadcast over a two-part weekend special. Episode 9 was shown on Saturday  6 October where all 24 acts performed for a place in their mentor's top three and, subsequently, the live shows. The final twelve were revealed the day after on Sunday 7 October in a special Sunday episode. This is notable because at that time it was known as the first Sunday episode to be aired in X Factor history (excluding The X Factor: Battle of the Stars which aired over eight consecutive nights over a week)

Judges Houses Performances
 Act in bold advanced 
Boys:
 Andy: "Sorry Seems to Be the Hardest Word"
 Dominic: "I'll Be There"
 Leon: "I Still Haven't Found What I'm Looking For"
 Charlie: "Patience" 
 Rhydian: "Somebody to Love"
 Luke: "Mandy"

Groups:
 Same Difference: "Nothing's Gonna Stop Us Now"
 Ghostt: "Have You Ever?"
 Futureproof: "Nobody Knows"
 W4: "Wishing on a Star"
 I Sette Cantanti: "California Girls"
 Hope: "Umbrella"

Over 25s:
 Niki: "One Moment in Time"
 Icaro: "Creep"
 Zyta: "Amazing Grace"
 Beverley: "When You Tell Me That You Love Me"
 Daniel B: "Father and Son"
 Daniel D: "Cannonball"

Girls:
 Kimberley: "I’ll Stand by You"
 Victoria: "Time After Time"
 Kim: "Eternal Flame"
 Alisha: "Chains" 
 Stephanie: "When You're Gone"
 Emily: "Beautiful"

{| class="wikitable plainrowheaders"
|+Summary of judges' houses
|-
! Judge
! Category
! Location
! Assistant
! Acts Eliminated
|-
!scope="row"| Minogue
| Boys
| Ibiza
| Terry Ronald
| Luke Bayer, Charlie Finn, Dom Hartley Harris
|-
!scope="row"| Cowell
| Groups
| Marbella
| Sinitta
| Ghostt, I Sette Cantanti, W4
|-
!scope="row"| Osbourne
| Girls
| Los Angeles
| Nicole Scherzinger
| Victoria Closs, Kimberley Howlett, Stephanie Woods
|-
!scope="row"| Walsh
| Over 25s
| Dublin
| Kian Egan
| Daniel Boulle, Icaro Taborda, Zyta Zebihi
|}

Acts 

Key:
 – Winner
 – Runner-Up
 – Withdrew

Live shows
The live shows commenced on 20 October 2007, a week later than in previous series. This was because of ITV's coverage of the 2007 Rugby World Cup. Ironically, 20 October 2007 also saw the final of the tournament take place in Paris, France. Dermot O'Leary mentioned ITV's broadcast of the game at the end of Live Show 1.

Series 4 saw the continuation of the themed live show format, in which the acts sing songs according to a different musical theme or genre each week. This format was introduced in series 3. Each week a celebrity guest connected to the theme performed in the results show, and some of the guests – Céline Dion, Boyz II Men, Girls Aloud and Michael Bublé – also coached the acts in rehearsal. Series 3 winner, Leona Lewis, appeared as a guest on the first live show on 20 October. During the results show she performed a premiere of her new single, "Bleeding Love", from her debut album, Spirit. Series 2 winner, Shayne Ward, also appeared as a guest on the fourth live show. He performed his latest single, "Breathless", from his second album of the same name during the results show on 10 November. Westlife appeared on the sixth live show on 24 November singing "I'm Already There" from their 2007 album Back Home. Duran Duran sang "Notorious" and "Nite-Runner" during the seventh live show results on 1 December.

The rules relating to judges' votes in the results show changed from previous series. In the past, the decision as to which act was sent home each week was made by the three judges (from which there would always be a majority). Now, with four judges, if there was a two-way tie (billed on the show as "deadlock") the act with the fewest votes from the public would be eliminated, otherwise the judges' decision would stand.

With the appointment of Friedman as choreographer, finalists used dance routines more frequently during their live performances in comparison to previous series.

Three acts (previously two for series 1 and 3) competed in the final for the £1 million recording contract.

Contrary to reports about a change of venue, the live shows for this series continued to be broadcast from The Fountain Studios. Unlike past series there was no dramatic change in the set, only minor alterations and space created for a larger audience.

It was reported that the producers of the show hired a counsellor to help the contestants deal with the pressure of appearing in the live shows each week.

Results summary
Colour key
 Act in team Dannii

 Act in team Simon

 Act in team Sharon

 Act in team Louis

Live show details

Week 1 (20 October)
Theme: Number ones
Musical guest: Leona Lewis ("Bleeding Love")
 Best bits song: "A Moment Like This"

Judges' votes to eliminate
Osbourne abstained from voting as both acts were in her category. In fact, she refused to sit at the judging panel during the final showdown performances.
Cowell: Kimberley Southwick – based on the premise that the show is a "singing competition".
Minogue: Alisha Bennett – gave no reason.
Walsh: Kimberley Southwick – stated that Bennett had the "talent factor" and had much more to give to the competition.

Week 2 (27 October)
Theme: Film themes
Musical guest: Celine Dion ("Taking Chances")
 Best bits song: "Chasing Cars"

Judges' votes to eliminate
Walsh: Alisha Bennett – backed his own act, Daniel DeBourg.
Osbourne: Daniel DeBourg – backed her own act, Alisha Bennett.
Minogue: Daniel DeBourg – gave no reason.
Cowell: Daniel DeBourg – stated that Bennett had more potential to improve.

Week 3 (3 November)
Theme: Big band
Musical guest: Boyz II Men ("It's The Same Old Song" / "Reach Out (I'll Be There)" / "End of the Road")
 Best bits song: "Never Forget"

 During the week leading up to the third live show, it was announced that Emily Nakanda had withdrawn from the competition due to a "happy slapping" video involving her that had emerged. She was not replaced and the elimination went ahead as normal. She was due to perform "It's Oh So Quiet" by Björk

Judges' votes to eliminate
Walsh: Futureproof – stated that Hope's performance on the night was "slick and energetic" and Futureproof's was "sloppy".
Osbourne: Futureproof – stated that she loved Hope.
Minogue: Hope – stated that neither act had performed well this week, but that Futureproof had delivered better performances in the previous two weeks.
Cowell: Futureproof – stated that Hope had greater long-term potential.

Week 4 (10 November) 
Theme: 21st century classics
Musical guest: Shayne Ward ("Breathless")
 Best bits song: "I Can't Make You Love Me"

Judges' votes to eliminate
Walsh: Andy Williams – backed his own act, Beverley Trotman.
Osbourne: Andy Williams – gave no reason.
Minogue: Beverley Trotman – backed her own act, Andy Williams.
Cowell: Andy Williams – stated that he believed the public would prefer to see Trotman saved.

Week 5 (17 November)
Theme: Disco
Musical guest: Girls Aloud ("Call the Shots")
 Best bits song: "Butterfly"

Judges' votes to eliminate
Cowell: Alisha Bennett – backed his own act, Hope.
Minogue: Alisha Bennett – gave no reason.
Osbourne: Hope – backed her own act, Alisha Bennett.
Walsh: Alisha Bennett – gave no reason but stated that neither act deserved to be in the bottom two.

Week 6 (24 November)
Theme: Love songs
Musical guest: Westlife ("I'm Already There")
 Best bits song: "One Moment in Time"

Judges' votes to eliminate
Walsh: Hope – backed his own act, Beverley Trotman.
Cowell: Beverley Trotman – backed his own act, Hope.
Minogue: Hope – stated that Trotman was more consistent.
Osbourne: Beverley Trotman – stated "I'm doing this for a reason, and you'll realise the reason when I say it. I'm sending home Beverley", implying that she wanted to cause a deadlock.

With the acts in the bottom two receiving two votes each, the result went to deadlock and reverted to the earlier public vote. Trotman was eliminated as the act with the fewest public votes.

Week 7: Quarter-Final (1 December)
Theme: British classics
Musical guest: Duran Duran ("Notorious")
 Best bits song: "I’ll Stand by You"

The quarter-final did not feature a final showdown and instead the act with the fewest public votes, Hope, were automatically eliminated.

Week 8: Semi-Final (8 December)
Themes: Mentor's choice; contestant's choice
Musical guest: Michael Bublé ("Lost")
 Best bits song: "I Will Always Love You"

The semi-final did not feature a final showdown and instead the act with the fewest public votes, Niki Evans, was automatically eliminated.

Week 9: Final (15 December)
Themes: Christmas songs; celebrity duets; song of the series; winner's single
Group performance: "One Moment in Time" (auditionees)
Musical guest: Kylie Minogue ("Wow")
 Best bits songs: "Breaking Free", "Time to Say Goodbye" & "Home"

Reception

Ratings
The fourth series proved yet again to be a ratings winner. The first episode peaked at 10.7 million viewers, with an average of 9.5 million viewers (45% share), according to unofficial overnight ratings. This was 2.5 million viewers higher than last year's launch, and higher than the series finale of both series 1 and series 2. Moreover, 60% of 16- to 34-year-olds tuned in that night. The Xtra Factor on ITV2 also performed well on its launch night, with an overnight figure of 1.2 million viewers watching the episode – 500,000 more than for the 2006 launch.

The second episode was another ratings success and attracted more viewers than all of the other terrestrial channels combined. The show peaked at 10 million viewers with an average of 8.5 million, beating its rival DanceX (the finale) on BBC One which attracted 3.6 million.

The third episode attracted 8.7 million viewers, which was considerably more than BBC One's Eurovision Dance Contest which achieved an audience of 3.8 million viewers. Viewing figures remained strong in the fourth episode, averaging 8.2 million viewers. The fifth episode featuring auditions generated 7 million viewers and a 43% share of audience. The sixth and final episode featuring auditions attracted another strong audience which peaked at 9.2 million and averaged with 8 million and an audience share of 45%.

The seventh and eighth episodes in the series featured the successful candidates auditioning at boot-camp. Despite competition from BBC One's Strictly Come Dancing, The X Factor received the highest viewing figures, beating Strictly Come Dancing by 2.1 million viewers and receiving 6.8 million in total. The second part of the show attracted 7.2 million viewers. The ninth instalment won 7.5 million viewers, narrowly beating the live launch of Strictly Come Dancing, which had 7.2 million.

The final of The X Factor on 15 December scored highly in the ratings with a peak audience of 12.1 million. The first part of the show attracted an average of 11.4 million viewers, whilst the second half averaged with 11.7 million viewers. This was the highest rating, in terms of total viewership, for all four series of the show.

Controversies

Osbourne's walkout
During the results of the first live show on 20 October, Osbourne walked away from the panel after it was revealed that both the bottom two acts came from her category. This left the three remaining judges, Cowell, Minogue and Walsh, to decide which of the bottom two would be sent home. When O'Leary asked Osbourne for her vote, she claimed to have left the show, saying, "I'm out—gone". It later emerged that Osbourne was dissatisfied with the last-minute rescheduling of the programme from 17:45 to 17:30, claiming that fewer people saw the performance of her act, Kimberley Southwick, as she was first on stage. After a considerable amount of media coverage, including Paul O'Grady apparently convincing Osbourne live on his chat show to return to The X Factor, Osbourne's spokesman confirmed on 23 October that she would return to the show.

Alleged feuds and alliances
During the filming of The X Factor, there was much media speculation about rumoured feuds between the judges, most notably between Osbourne and Minogue. In an interview published on 2 December 2007, Minogue stated "As for Sharon, you don't click with everybody. But it's her choice not to be friends. Apparently she's envious because I'm younger and prettier." Cowell admitted that Osbourne did not feel comfortable about having a new judge and that Osbourne and Minogue would never be "the best of buddies," adding that if Osbourne wanted to leave the show, he would let her (in fact, Osbourne left after series 4). The apparent flirting between Cowell and Minogue also generated comment in the popular media.

Impartiality
Series 4 presented a change in the panellists' judging style. Simon Cowell said at the ITV Autumn Launch: "We tried to be bit more impartial as judges, and that, you'll see a lot more of on X Factor. There's still competition within the judges but our job essentially is to find a star." This ethic was put into practice with the judges working together at the bootcamp. During the live shows, the acts were no longer introduced with their mentors at the start of the show. Only the judges were introduced, after which the individual performances began.

Standard of talent
At ITV's Autumn launch on 12 July 2007, Cowell discussed the upcoming series. He said that in previous years the programme had been more like a "popularity contest" than a talent show. When asked about the standard of talent, Cowell said: "It's in a different league this year... we're going to have the best 12 [finalists] we've ever seen". This came with comments that the series 4 auditions had gone "brilliantly".

Series 4 also saw more emphasis placed on the international standing of The X Factor, with Cowell calling it "the biggest show in Europe" with around 150,000 auditioning for the series. Referring to the impact that the international success of series 3 winner Leona Lewis had had on the show, Dannii Minogue said at the Sheffield auditions: "I think that Leona has completely upped the ante now on this show, and there's no turning back. We're looking for an international standard of acts that can sell millions of albums". In response to the expectation of a raised standard of talent on the show, producers tried with series 4 to assemble what O'Leary called an "international panel of judges"; this was particularly the case with the original judging line-up that included Friedman. There were also more international contestants in series 4, with two acts from the United States, numerous acts from Japan and a Brazilian act auditioning.

Nevertheless, Cowell said before the first live show that "I think we could be heading for a train wreck," referring to the fact that the public did not believe any of the final 12 this year were as good as Lewis, but he added, "But if you take Leona out of the equation, they weren't that good last year. As a whole, we've probably got the most talented 12 we've had. We just haven't had the chance to showcase them properly yet."

Contestants
Following girlband Hope's victory at judges houses, member Sisi Jghalef was eliminated prior to the live shows when it was discovered by the producers that she had an outstanding criminal conviction, thus violating the rules of the competition. Prior to auditioning as a solo artist, Jghalef had reportedly racially threatened a black McDonald's worker and failed to complete 200 hours of community service. Following her elimination, she had reportedly tried to commit suicide by attempting to overdose on paracetamol: "If my mum hadn't found me I would be dead by now [...]  I've managed to pull myself together [now] thanks to my friends and family", she told Mirror Online. On her elimination, Jghalef said: "I could have understood it if I hadn't made the final, but to have been told I was then in and let the TV cameras record my joy only to then be told I was axed was too much to take". Jghalef also later admitted to smoking cannabis at bootcamp: "I only did a bit of weed", she claimed. "There was a lot more [harder drugs] than that going on and there's video tapes to prove it". An X Factor spokesman said: "We weren't aware she was smoking cannabis and we wouldn't condone it. It shows we were right to get rid of her."

Alleged voting irregularities
It was reported that Ofcom received at least 1,900 complaints from would-be voters for eventual runner-up Rhydian Roberts, saying that despite calling numerous times they were unable to get through to vote for Roberts. The programme said the high number of calls meant some people were greeted by engaged tones. ITV denied the allegations, commenting that "As all numbers go through to the same lines and vote platform it is impossible for there to be any bias in favour or against a particular contestant." ITV confirmed that Jackson performed strongly throughout the series and won on the night of the final by around 10% of the popular vote. A subsequent Ofcom investigation found that Roberts had not been unfairly disadvantaged.

References

 04
2007 in British music
2007 British television seasons
United Kingdom 04